Sir Edward Astley, 4th Baronet (baptised 26 December 1729 – 27 March 1802) was a British politician who sat in the House of Commons  from 1768 to 1790.

Early life and career
He was the oldest son of Sir Jacob Astley, 3rd Baronet and his second wife Lucy le Strange, youngest daughter of Sir Nicholas le Strange, 4th Baronet. He was admitted to Pembroke College, Cambridge in 1747. In 1760, Astley succeeded his father as baronet.

He was appointed High Sheriff of Norfolk for 1763–64 and in 1768 stood successfully as Member of Parliament (MP) for Norfolk, the same constituency his great-grandfather Sir Jacob Astley, 1st Baronet had represented, too. Astley held this seat unopposed until the 1790 general election when he retired. He was a supporter of parliamentary reform.

Astley had a younger brother, John Astley (born 1735), who was Rector of several Norfolk parishes.

Marriage and children

Astley married firstly Rhoda Delaval, oldest daughter of Francis Blake Delaval in 1751. Rhoda died in childbirth in 1757 and Astley married secondly Anne Milles, youngest daughter of Christopher Milles, at St Margaret's Church, Westminster two years later. She died in 1792, and he married lastly Elizabeth Bullen in the following year. Astley had three sons and a daughter by his first wife and five sons and two daughters by his second wife. On his death in 1802 Astley was succeeded in the baronetcy by his third but oldest surviving son Sir Jacob Astley, 5th Baronet, who at this time sat also for Norfolk in the House of Commons.

References

1729 births
1802 deaths
People from North Norfolk (district)
Alumni of Pembroke College, Oxford
Baronets in the Baronetage of England
Members of the Parliament of Great Britain for Norfolk
British MPs 1768–1774
British MPs 1774–1780
British MPs 1780–1784
British MPs 1784–1790
High Sheriffs of Norfolk